Corydoras ehrhardti is a tropical freshwater fish belonging to the Corydoradinae sub-family of the family Callichthyidae.  It originates in coastal rivers in the Santa Catarina and Paraná states of Brazil from the Iguazu River basin.

The fish will grow in length up to 1.6 inches (4.1 centimeters).  It lives in a tropical climate in water with a 6.0 - 8.0 pH, a water hardness of 2 - 25 dGH, and a temperature range of 72 - 79 °F (22 - 26 °C).  It feeds on worms, benthic crustaceans, insects, and plant matter.  It lays eggs in dense vegetation and adults do not guard the eggs.

See also
 List of freshwater aquarium fish species

References

External links
 Photos from Fishbase

Corydoras
Fish described in 1910